The Imuruk Lake volcanic field is a volcanic field in western Alaska, United States, located by Imuruk Lake in the Bering Land Bridge National Preserve in central Seward Peninsula. It is considered part of the Bering Sea Volcanic Province.

References

Landforms of Nome Census Area, Alaska
Landforms of Northwest Arctic Borough, Alaska
Volcanic fields of Alaska
Landforms of Unorganized Borough, Alaska
Landforms of the Seward Peninsula